= Kousalya Tanaya Raghava =

Indian Telugu language romantic drama film

- Theatrical release poster
- Directed by: Swamy Patnaik
- Written by: Swamy Patnaik
- Produced by: Ratnakar Adapa
- Starring: Rajesh Konchada; Sravani Setti; Venkatesh Maradapudi; Koteswara Rao; Rangasthalam Mahesh
- Cinematography: Yogi Reddy
- Edited by: Pataballa Shri Krishnaprasad
- Music by: Rajesh Raj Thelu
- Production company: AR Movie Makers
- Release date: 11 April 2025
- Running time: 147 Minutes
- Country: India
- Language: Telugu

Kousalya Tanaya Raghava is a 2025 Indian Telugu-language romantic drama film directed by Swamy Patnaik, produced by Ratnakar Adapa under AR Movie Makers. The film stars Rajesh Konchada, Sravani Setti, Venkatesh Maradapudi, Koteswara Rao, and Rangasthalam Mahesh. Music scored by Rajesh Raj Thelu and edited by Pataballa Shri Krishnaprasad.

== Plot ==
In a flashback set in the 1980s, the movie opens with a guy telling us about his grandfather. The son of Kausalya (Sunita Manohar), Raghava (Rajesh Konchada) is a member of a backward caste and is attending college in a rural. Another girl from a higher caste who attends the same college is Kavya (Sravani Shetty). They fall in love, but because of caste disparities, their relationship encounters social obstacles. A panchayat decides to split up the couple after Raghava is pressured by a college group to proclaim his love in front of the village elders. Whether their love endures and how Raghava realises his mother's desire are the subjects of the remaining narrative.

== Cast ==
- Rajesh Konchada

== Release and reception ==
Kousalya Tanaya Raghava theatrically released on 11 April 2025

Ramu Chinthakindhi from Times Now Telugu said those who like simple village love stories will like Kausalya Tanaya Raghava.
